Perfecta may refer to:

 Perfecta (album), a 1995 album by Adam Again
 Perfecta (gambling), a type of bet in parimutuel betting
 Perfecta, an album by Banda Los Recoditos
 "Perfecta", a song by Miranda! featuring Julieta Venegas from the album El Disco de Tu Corazón
 "Perfecta", a song by Jesse & Joy from the album ¿Con Quién Se Queda El Perro?
 La Perfecta, a band from Martinique

See also
 
 Perfect (disambiguation)
 Perfecto (disambiguation)